The 22969 / 22970 Okha–Varanasi Superfast Express is a superfast train belonging to Western Railway zone that runs between  and  in India. It is currently being operated with 22969/22970 train numbers on a weekly basis.

Coach composition

The train has standard ICF rakes with max speed of 110 kmph. The train consists of 23 coaches:

 1 AC II Tier
 5 AC III Tier
 10 Sleeper coaches
 1 Pantry Car
 4 General Unreserved
 2 Seating cum Luggage Rake

Service

22969/Okha–Varanasi Superfast Express has an average speed of 55 km/hr and covers 2042 km in 35 hrs 55 mins.

22970/Varanasi–Okha Superfast Express has an average speed of 58 km/hr and covers 2042 km in 33 hrs 50 mins.

Route & Halts 

The important halts of the train are :

Schedule

Rake sharing

The train shares its rake with 19573/19574 Okha–Jaipur Weekly Express.

Direction reversal

Train reverses its direction 1 times at:

Traction

Both trains are hauled by a Sabarmati-based WDP-4D diesel locomotive from Okha to Ahmedabad Junction. From Ahmedabad Junction both trains are hauled by a Vadodara-based WAP-4E / WAP-5 electric locomotive to Varanasi and vice versa.

See also 

 Okha railway station
 Varanasi Junction railway station
 Sabarmati Express

References

External links 

22969/Okha–Varanasi Superfast Express India Rail Info
22970/Varanasi–Okha Superfast Express India Rail Info

Rail transport in Gujarat
Rail transport in Madhya Pradesh
Transport in Okha
Passenger trains originating from Varanasi
Express trains in India
Railway services introduced in 2012